The 1921 Mid Down by-election was held on 2 July 1921.  The by-election was held due to the incumbent Ulster Unionist MP, James Craig, being elected Prime Minister of Northern Ireland. It was won by the UUP candidate Robert Sharman-Crawford.

References

Mid Down
Mid Down 1921
Mid Down 1921
20th century in County Down
Mid Down